The 1982 Jacksonville State Gamecocks football team represented Jacksonville State University as a member of the Gulf South Conference (GSC) during the 1982 NCAA Division II football season. Led by sixth-year head coach Jim Fuller, the Gamecocks compiled an overall record of 10–2 with a mark of 7–0 in conference play, and finished as GSC champion. In the playoffs, Jacksonville State were defeated by Southwest Texas State in the semifinals.

Schedule

References

Jacksonville State
Jacksonville State Gamecocks football seasons
Gulf South Conference football champion seasons
Jacksonville State Gamecocks football